The following is a list of county routes in Ocean County in the U.S. state of New Jersey.  For more information on the county route system in New Jersey as a whole, including its history, see County routes in New Jersey.

500-series county routes
In addition to those listed below, the following 500-series county routes serve Ocean County:
CR 526, CR 527, CR 528, CR 530, CR 532, CR 537, CR 539, CR 547, CR 549, CR 549 Spur, CR 554, CR 571

Other county routes

See also

References

 
Ocean